Çamlıca is a village in the Adıyaman District, Adıyaman Province, Turkey. The village is populated by Kurds of the Kawan tribe and had a population of 210 in 2021.

The hamlets of Alıheri, Bahçe, Çiftlice and Gedik are attached to the village.

References

Villages in Adıyaman District
Kurdish settlements in Adıyaman Province